René Henri Ronsil (18 April 1908, Ménilles – 17 October 1956, Louveciennes) was a French naturalist who specialised in ornithology especially the bibliography of bird literature. He was also an operatic tenor.

References
Farber, Paul Lawrence (December 1977). "The Development of Taxidermy and the History of Ornithology".  Isis. 68 (4): 550–566. The University of Chicago Press on behalf of The History of Science Society.

French ornithologists
1956 deaths
1908 births
20th-century French zoologists